The Peteano massacre was a neo-fascist terrorist attack which occurred on May 31, 1972 in Peteano, a frazione of Sagrado (Gorizia), Italy. An anonymous call led five carabinieri to check a suspicious car, which turned out to be a car bomb that exploded when the door was opened. Three carabinieri were killed.

The perpetrators were Vincenzo Vinciguerra, Carlo Cicuttini and Ivano Boccaccio, all members of Ordine Nuovo, a far-right organisation. Boccaccio was killed in a separate action in October 1972, while Vinciguerra and Cicuttini were both convicted to life in prison. Cicuttini lived as a fugitive in Spain for several years before his arrest in 1998; he was released for health reason shortly before his death in 2010.

History 
The period in which this bloody  event took place was in a precise and delicate historical-political context: on May 7, 1972 the early political elections had taken place, which had assigned the leadership of the country to a new executive chaired by Giulio Andreotti, while the Calabresi murder occurred on 17 May. The political debate was still turbulent, and was accompanied by feared attempts at coup d'état. Before Peteano, there were several terrorist attacks and massacres of fascist origin, in conjunction with the tensions linked to the groups of the extra-parliamentary left that had undertaken the armed struggle, there was a climate of tension and concern within the parties. politicians and government, a first step towards what has been called "theory of opposite extremisms".

The night of May 31, at 22:35, an anonymous phone call reached the switchboard of the emergency service of the Carabinieri station of Gorizia: to receive it and to register it was the switchboard operator Domenico La Malfa. The text of the communication in dialectal language is as follows::

Three  gazelles  of the carabinieri arrived on the marked place, who found the white Fiat 500 with the two holes on the windscreen, as the anonymous informant had communicated in dialect. The first patrol that is sent is that of the Gradisca carabinieri, with the pinned Mango and the carabiniere Dongiovanni. Ten minutes later the two are on site and find the Cinquecento number plate GO 45902. It is visible in a dirt lane, immediately after a curve, at kilometer 5. Mango decides to call his officer, Lieutenant Tagliari, who also leaves accompanied by the brigadier Antonio Ferraro and the carabiniere Donato Poveromo and arrive on the spot with a second gazelle at 23:05, then joined by a third patrol from Gorizia.

The carabinieri Antonio Ferraro, Donato Poveromo and Franco Dongiovanni attempted to open the hood of the vehicle, causing the car to explode and being killed, while two others were seriously injured.

Investigations 
Colonel Dino Mingarelli, the old right-hand man of the general Giovanni de Lorenzo, was placed to direct the investigation on the matter. Mingarelli immediately directed his investigation into the Lotta Continua circles of Trento, but the investigations did not obtain the expected results: the Milanese judiciary received information according to which the attack would be carried out by a group neo-fascist terrorist, which also included Ivano Boccaccio, a militant killed in an attempted hijacking of a plane at Ronchi dei Legionari airport in the following October.

The information had been given by Giovanni Ventura, meanwhile arrested for the Piazza Fontana bombing: the colonel however discarded the Milanese indication, as an order from the SID invited him to suspend investigations into the far-right terrorist group. The colonel, with his "right arm" captain Antonino Chirico, directed the investigative attentions towards six young people, leading them to trial: according to Mingarelli they would take revenge on some rude people suffered by the carabinieri.

The proposed motive did not convince the judges, who acquitted the six young people, who, once free, denounced Mingarelli for the false accusations, initiating a new investigation against police officers and magistrates for having diverted the investigations. Meanwhile, the investigation of the massacre was directed towards the neo-fascist circles.

References 

Years of Lead (Italy)
Massacres in Italy
Neo-fascist terrorist incidents